The Ratcliffe–Logan–Allison House is a historic home located at Fairfax, Virginia. It is commonly and historically known as Earp's Ordinary, as the structure is an expansion of the original Earp's Ordinary, a late 18th Century building used as a tavern and store by Caleb Earp. It consists of two sections built about 1810 and about 1830, and is a small two-story, single pile brick building. A two-story rear wing connected by a hyphen was added in the 20th century.  A postal station and stage coach stop operated from the building in the 1820s-1830s.

It was listed on the National Register of Historic Places in 1973.  It is located in the City of Fairfax Historic District.

The house is owned and operated as a historic house museum by the City of Fairfax.

References

External links
 City of Fairfax: Historic Buildings and Sites
 Historic Fairfax City: Historic Buildings and Sites

Houses on the National Register of Historic Places in Virginia
Houses completed in 1830
National Register of Historic Places in Fairfax, Virginia
Individually listed contributing properties to historic districts on the National Register in Virginia
1830 establishments in Virginia
Houses in Fairfax, Virginia
Museums in Fairfax County, Virginia
Historic house museums in Virginia